Nicholas Ian Shepherd-Barron, FRS (born 17 March 1955), is a British mathematician working in algebraic geometry.  He has been, since 2013, professor of mathematics at King's College London, having moved there from his previous position at the University of Cambridge. He is a fellow of Trinity College, Cambridge.

Education
Shepherd-Barron was a scholar of Winchester College. He obtained his B.A. at Jesus College, Cambridge in 1976, and studied for a Ph.D. at the University of Warwick under the supervision of Miles Reid, graduating in 1981.

Career and research
Shepherd-Barron works in various aspects of algebraic geometry, such as: singularities in the minimal model program; compactification of moduli spaces; the rationality of orbit spaces, including the moduli spaces of curves of genus 4 and 6; the geography of algebraic surfaces in positive characteristic, including a proof of Raynaud's conjecture; canonical models of moduli spaces of abelian varieties; the Schottky problem at the boundary; the relation between algebraic groups and del Pezzo surfaces; the period map for elliptic surfaces.

In 2008, with the number theorists Michael Harris and Richard Taylor, he proved the original version of the Sato–Tate conjecture and its generalization to totally real fields, under mild assumptions.

Awards and honors
Shepherd-Barron was elected Fellow of the Royal Society in 2006.

Personal life
He is the son of John Shepherd-Barron, a Scottish inventor, who was responsible for inventing the first cash machine in 1967.

Notes

References

1955 births
Living people
20th-century British mathematicians
21st-century British mathematicians
Algebraic geometers
People educated at Winchester College
Alumni of Jesus College, Cambridge
Fellows of Trinity College, Cambridge
Fellows of the Royal Society
Academics of King's College London
Professors of the University of Cambridge